Potoci is a village in the municipality of Drvar, Bosnia and Herzegovina.

Demographics 

According to the 2013 census, the village was uninhabited.

Footnotes

Bibliography 

 

Populated places in Drvar